Shirley Brown is a former Democratic member of the Florida House of Representatives who served the 69th District from 1992 until 2000. She has represented District 4 of the Sarasota County School Board since 2006 and will retire following the conclusion of her 3rd term in 2022.

Biography
Brown was born on October 2, 1952, in Oshkosh, Wisconsin. She is a member of the League of Women Voters and the Junior League and is Presbyterian.

Career
Brown was elected to the Florida House of Representatives and represented the 69th district as a Democrat from 1992 until 2000. She was a delegate from Florida to the 1996 Democratic National Convention.

Since being elected to serve District 4 on the Sarasota County School Board in 2006, Brown has been re-elected three times.

References

Politicians from Oshkosh, Wisconsin
Democratic Party members of the Florida House of Representatives
Women state legislators in Florida
1952 births
Living people
21st-century American women